Thomas Alan Waits (born December 7, 1949) is an American musician, composer, songwriter, and actor. His lyrics often focus on the underbelly of society and are delivered in his trademark deep, gravelly voice. He worked primarily in jazz during the 1970s, but his music since the 1980s has reflected greater influence from blues, rock, vaudeville, and experimental genres.

Waits was born and raised in a middle-class family in California. Inspired by the work of Bob Dylan and the Beat Generation, he began singing on the San Diego folk music circuit as a young man. He relocated to Los Angeles in 1972, where he worked as a songwriter before signing a recording contract with Asylum Records. His first albums were the jazz-oriented Closing Time (1973) and The Heart of Saturday Night (1974), which reflected his lyrical interest in nightlife, poverty, and criminality. He repeatedly toured the United States, Europe, and Japan, and attracted greater critical recognition and commercial success with Small Change (1976), Blue Valentine (1978), and Heartattack and Vine (1980). He produced the soundtrack for Francis Ford Coppola's film One from the Heart (1981), and subsequently made cameo appearances in several Coppola films.

In 1980, Waits married Kathleen Brennan, split from his manager and record label, and moved to New York City. With Brennan's encouragement and frequent collaboration, he pursued a more experimental and eclectic musical aesthetic influenced by the work of Harry Partch and Captain Beefheart. This was reflected in a series of albums released by Island Records, including Swordfishtrombones (1983), Rain Dogs (1985), and Franks Wild Years (1987). He continued appearing in films, notably starring in Jim Jarmusch's Down by Law (1986), and also made theatrical appearances. With theatre director Robert Wilson, he produced the musicals The Black Rider (1990) and Alice (1992), first performed in Hamburg. Having returned to California in the 1990s, his albums Bone Machine (1992), The Black Rider (1993), and Mule Variations (1999) earned him increasing critical acclaim and multiple Grammy Awards. In the late 1990s, he switched to the record label ANTI-, which released Blood Money (2002), Alice (2002), Real Gone (2004), and Bad as Me (2011).

Despite a lack of mainstream commercial success, Waits has influenced many musicians and gained an international cult following, and several biographies have been written about him.  In 2015, he was ranked at No. 55 on Rolling Stone "100 Greatest Songwriters of All Time". He was inducted into the Rock and Roll Hall of Fame in 2011.

Biography

Childhood and adolescence: 1949–1971

Thomas Alan Waits was born on December 7, 1949, in Whittier, California. He has one older sister and one younger sister. His father, Jesse Frank Waits, was a Texas native of Scots-Irish descent, while his mother, Alma Fern (née Johnson), hailed from Oregon and had Norwegian ancestry. Alma, a regular church-goer, managed the household. Jesse taught Spanish at a local school and was an alcoholic; Waits later related that his father was "a tough one, always an outsider". The family lived at 318 North Pickering Avenue in Whittier, California. He described having a "very middle-class" upbringing and "a pretty normal childhood". He attended Jordan Elementary School, where he was bullied. There, he learned to play the bugle and guitar. His father taught him to play the ukulele. 

During the summers, he visited maternal relatives in Gridley and Marysville. He later recalled that it was an uncle's raspy, gravelly voice that inspired the manner in which he later sang. In 1959, his parents separated and his father moved away from the family home, which was a traumatic experience for 10-year-old Waits. Alma took her children and relocated to Chula Vista, a middle-class suburb of San Diego. Jesse visited the family there, taking his children on trips to Tijuana. In nearby Southeast San Diego, Waits attended O'Farrell Community School, where he fronted a school band, the Systems, later describing the group as "white kids trying to get that Motown sound". He developed a love of R&B and soul singers like Ray Charles, James Brown, and Wilson Pickett, as well as country music and Roy Orbison. Bob Dylan later became a strong influence, with Waits placing transcriptions of Dylan's lyrics on his bedroom walls. He was an avid watcher of The Alfred Hitchcock Hour and The Twilight Zone. 

By the time he was studying at Hilltop High School, he later related, he was "kind of an amateur juvenile delinquent", interested in "malicious mischief" and breaking the law. He later described himself as a "rebel against the rebels", for he eschewed the hippie subculture which was growing in popularity and was instead inspired by the 1950s Beat generation, having a love of Beat writers like Jack Kerouac, Allen Ginsberg, and William S. Burroughs. In 1968, at age 18, he dropped out of high school.

Waits worked at Napoleone's pizza restaurant in National City, California, and both there and at a local diner developed an interest in the lives of the patrons, writing down phrases and snippets of dialogue he overheard. He said he worked in the forestry service as a fireman for three years  and served with the Coast Guard. He enrolled at Chula Vista's Southwestern Community College to study photography, for a time considering a career in the field. He continued pursuing his musical interests, taking piano lessons. He began frequenting folk music venues around San Diego, becoming drawn into the city's folk music scene.

In 1969, he gained employment as an occasional doorman for the Heritage coffeehouse, which held regular performances from folk musicians. He also began to sing at the Heritage; his set initially consisted largely of covers of Dylan and Red Sovine's "Big Joe and Phantom 309". 

In time, he performed his own material as well, often parodies of country songs or bittersweet ballads influenced by his relationships with girlfriends; these included early songs "Ol' 55" and "I Hope That I Don't Fall in Love With You". As his reputation spread, he played at other San Diego venues, supporting acts like Tim Buckley, Sonny Terry, Brownie McGhee, and his friend Jack Tempchin. Aware that San Diego offered little opportunity for career progression, Waits began traveling into Los Angeles to play at the Troubadour.

Early musical career: 1972–1976

In the autumn of 1971, at the Troubadour in West Hollywood, Waits came to the attention of Herb Cohen, who signed him to a publishing contract and a recording contract. The recordings that were produced under that recording agreement were eventually released in the early 1990s as The Early Years, Volume One and The Early Years, Volume Two. Quitting his job at Napoleone's to concentrate on his songwriting career, in early 1972 Waits moved to an apartment in Silver Lake, Los Angeles, a poor neighborhood known for its Hispanic and bohemian communities.
He continued performing at the Troubadour and there met David Geffen, who gave Waits a recording contract with his Asylum Records. Jerry Yester was chosen to produce his first album, with the recording sessions taking place in Hollywood's Sunset Sound studios. The resulting album, Closing Time, was released in March 1973, although it attracted little attention and did not sell well. Biographer Barney Hoskyns noted that Closing Time was "broadly in step with the singer-songwriter school of the early 1970s"; Waits had wanted to create a piano-led jazz album although Yester had pushed its sound in a more folk-oriented direction. An Eagles recording of its opening track, "Ol' 55", on their album On the Border, brought Waits further money and recognition, although he regarded their version as "a little antiseptic".

To promote his debut, Waits and a three-piece band embarked on a U.S. tour, largely on the East Coast, where he was the supporting act for more established artists. As part of this, he supported Tom Rush at Washington D.C.'s The Cellar Door, Danny O'Keefe at Massachusetts's Club Passim, Charlie Rich at New York City's Max's Kansas City, Martha Reeves and the Vandellas in East Lansing, Michigan, and John P. Hammond in San Francisco.
Waits returned to Los Angeles in June, feeling demoralized about his career. That month, he was the cover star of free music magazine, Music World. He began composing songs for his second album, and attended the Venice Poetry Workshop to try out this new material in front of an audience. Although Waits was eager to record this new material, Cohen instead convinced him to take over as a support act for Frank Zappa's the Mothers of Invention after previous support act Kathy Dalton pulled out due to the hostility from Zappa's fans. Waits joined Zappa's tour in Ontario, but like Dalton found the audiences hostile; while on stage he was jeered at and pelted with fruit. Although he liked the Mothers of Invention's band members, he found Zappa himself intimidating.

Waits moved from Silver Lake to Echo Park, spending much of his time in downtown Los Angeles. In early 1974, he continued to perform around the West Coast, getting as far as Denver. For Waits's second album, Geffen wanted a more jazz-oriented producer, selecting Bones Howe for the job. Howe recounts his first encounter with the young artist: "I told him I thought his music and lyrics had a Kerouac quality to them, and he was blown away that I knew who Jack Kerouac was. I told him I also played jazz drums and he went wild. Then I told him that when I was working for Norman Granz, Norman had found these tapes of Kerouac reading his poetry from The Beat Generation in a hotel room. I told Waits I'd make him a copy. That sealed it." Recording sessions for The Heart of Saturday Night took place at Wally Heider's Studio 3 on Cahuenga Boulevard in Hollywood in April and May, with Waits conceptualising the album as a sequence of songs about U.S. nightlife. The album was far more widely reviewed than Closing Time had been, reflecting Waits's growing notability on the American music scene. Waits himself was later dismissive of the album, describing it as "very ill-formed, but I was trying".

After recording The Heart of Saturday Night, Waits reluctantly agreed to tour with Zappa again, but once more faced strong audience hostility. The kudos of having supported Zappa's tour nevertheless bolstered his image in the music industry and helped his career. In October 1974, he first performed as the headline act before touring the East Coast; in New York City he met and befriended the singer Bette Midler, with whom he had a sporadic affair. Back in Los Angeles, Cohen suggested Waits produce a live album. To this end, he performed two live shows at the Record Plant Studio in front of an audience. Again produced and engineered by Howe (as all his future Asylum releases would be), the recording was released as Nighthawks at the Diner in October 1975.

He followed this with a week's residency at the Reno Sweeney nightclub, an off-Broadway–style club in New York City.  In December he appeared on the PBS concert show Soundstage. From March to May 1976, he toured the U.S., telling interviewers that the experience was tough and that he was drinking too much alcohol. In May, he embarked on his first tour of Europe, performing in London, Amsterdam, Brussels, and Copenhagen. On his return to Los Angeles, he joined his friend Chuck E. Weiss by moving into the Tropicana motel in West Hollywood, a place that already had an established reputation in rock music circles. Visitors noted his two-room apartment there was heavily cluttered. He was living in what biographer Hoskyns later called a "pastiche of poverty"; Waits told the Los Angeles Times that "You almost have to create situations in order to write about them, so I live in a constant state of self-imposed poverty".

Small Change and Foreign Affairs: 1976–1978
In July 1976, he recorded the album Small Change, again produced by Howe. In later years, he described it as a seminal episode in his development as a songwriter, describing it as the point when he became "completely confident in the craft". On release, the album was critically well received and was his first release to break into the Billboard Top 100 Album List, peaking at number 89. Later, biographer Patrick Humphries called Small Change Waits's "masterpiece". He received growing press attention, being profiled in Newsweek, Time, Vogue, and The New Yorker; he had begun to accrue a cult following. He went on tour to promote the new album, backed by the Nocturnal Emissions (Frank Vicari, Chip White and Fitz Jenkins). In reference to his song "Pasties and a G-String", a female stripper came onstage during his performances. He began 1977 by touring Japan for the first time.

Back in Los Angeles, he encountered various problems. One female fan, recently escaped from a mental health institution in Illinois, began stalking him and lurking outside his Tropicana apartment. In May 1977, Waits and close friend Chuck E. Weiss were arrested for fighting with police officers in a coffee shop. They were charged with two counts of disturbing the peace but were acquitted after the defense produced eight witnesses who refuted the police officers' account of the incident. In response, Waits sued the Los Angeles Police Department and five years later was awarded $7,500 in damages.

In July and August 1977, he recorded his fourth studio album, Foreign Affairs; Bob Alcivar had been employed as its arranger. The album included "I Never Talk to Strangers", a duet with Midler, with whom he was still in an intermittent relationship. She appeared with him at the Troubadour to sing the song; the next day he repaid the favor by performing at a gay rights benefit at the Hollywood Bowl that Midler was involved with. Foreign Affairs was not as well received by critics as its predecessor, and unlike Small Change failed to make the Billboard Top 100 album chart. That year, he began a relationship with the singer-songwriter Rickie Lee Jones; their work and styles influenced each other. In October 1977, he returned to touring with the Nocturnal Emissions; it was on this tour that he first began using props onstage, in this case a street lamp. Again, he found the tour exhausting. In March 1978, he embarked on his second tour of Japan.

During these years, Waits sought to broaden his career beyond music by involving himself in other projects. Waits became friends with the actor and director Sylvester Stallone and made his first cinematic appearance as a cameo part in Stallone's Paradise Alley (1978); Waits appeared as a drunk piano player. With Paul Hampton, Waits also began writing a movie musical, although this project never came to fruition. Another of the projects he began at this time was a book about entertainers of the past whom he admired.

Blue Valentine and Heartattack and Vine: 1978–1980

In July 1978, Waits began the recording sessions for his album Blue Valentine. Part way through the sessions, he replaced his musicians in order to create a less jazz-oriented sound; for the album, he switched from a piano to an electric guitar as his main instrument. For the album's back cover, Waits used a picture of himself and Jones leaning against his car, a 1964 Ford Thunderbird, taken by Elliot Gilbert. From the album, Waits's first single was released, a performance of "Somewhere", from the musical "West Side Story", but it failed to chart. For his Blue Valentine tour, Waits assembled a new band; he also had a gas station built for use as a set during his performances. His support act on the tour was Leon Redbone. In April, he embarked on a European tour, there making television appearances and press interviews; in Austria he was the subject of a short documentary. From there, he flew to Australia for his first tour of that country before returning to Los Angeles in May.

Waits was dissatisfied with Elektra-Asylum, who he felt had lost interest in him as an artist in favor of their more commercially successful acts like the Eagles, Linda Ronstadt, Carly Simon, and Queen. Jones's musical career was taking off; after an appearance on Saturday Night Live, her single "Chuck E.'s In Love" reached number 4 in the singles chart, straining her relationship with Waits. Their relationship was further damaged by Jones's heroin addiction. Waits joined Jones for the first leg of her European tour, but then ended his relationship with her. Her grief at the breakup was channelled into the 1981 album Pirates. In September, Waits moved to Crenshaw Boulevard to be closer to his father, before deciding to relocate to New York City. He initially lived in the Chelsea Hotel before renting an apartment on West 26th Street. On arriving in the city, he told a reporter that he "just needed a new urban landscape. I've always wanted to live here. It's a good working atmosphere for me". In the city, he contemplated writing a Broadway musical to be based on Thornton Wilder's Our Town.

The film director Francis Ford Coppola then asked Waits to return to Los Angeles to write a soundtrack for his forthcoming film, One from the Heart, which was to be set in Las Vegas. Waits was excited, but conflicted, by the prospect; Coppola wanted him to create music akin to his early work, a genre that he was trying to leave behind, and thus he characterized the project as an artistic "step backwards" for him. He nevertheless returned to Los Angeles to work on the soundtrack in a room set aside for the purpose in Coppola's Hollywood studios. This style of working was new to Waits; he later recalled that he was "so insecure when I started ... I was sweating buckets". Waits was nominated for the 1982 Academy Award for Original Music Score.

Waits still contractually owed Elektra-Asylum a further album, so took a break from Coppola's project to write an album that he initially called White Spades. He recorded the album in June; it was released in September as Heartattack and Vine. The album was more guitar-based and had—according to Humphries—"a harder, R&B edge"—than any of its predecessors. It again broke into the Top 100 Album Chart, peaking at number 96. Reviews were generally good. Hoskyns called it "one of Waits's pinnacle achievements" as an album. One of its tracks, "Jersey Girl", was subsequently recorded by Bruce Springsteen. Waits was grateful, both for the revenue that the cover brought him and because he felt appreciated by a songwriter whom he admired.

Swordfishtrombones and New York City: 1980–1984

While on the set of One from the Heart, Waits met Kathleen Brennan, a young Irish-American woman working as an assistant story editor; Waits later described encountering her as "love at first sight". They were engaged to be married within a week. In August 1980, they married at a 24-hour wedding chapel on Manchester Boulevard in Watts before honeymooning in Tralee, a town in County Kerry, Ireland, where Brennan had family. Returning to Los Angeles, the couple moved into a Union Avenue apartment. Hoskyns noted that with Brennan, "Waits had found the stabilizing, nurturing companion he'd always wanted", and that she brought him "a sense of emotional security he had never known" before. At the same time, many of his old friends felt cut off after his marriage. Brennan shunned the media and refused all interview requests.

Recording of Waits's One from the Heart soundtrack began in October 1980 and continued until September 1981. A number of the tracks were recorded as duets with Crystal Gayle; Waits had initially planned to duet with Midler but she proved unavailable. The film was released in 1982, to largely poor reviews. Waits makes a small cameo in it, playing a trumpet in a crowd scene. Waits's soundtrack album, also titled One from the Heart, was released by Columbia Records in 1982. Waits had had his own misgivings about the album, thinking it over-produced.
 Humphries thought that working with Coppola was an important move in Waits's career: it "led directly to Waits moving from cult (i.e. largely unknown) artiste to center-stage."

Newly married and with his Elektra-Asylum contract completed, Waits decided that it was time to artistically reinvent himself. He wanted to move away from using Howe as his producer, although the two parted on good terms. With Brennan's help, he began the process of firing Cohen as his manager, with he and Brennan taking on managerial responsibilities themselves. He came to believe that Cohen had been swindling him out of much of his earnings, later relating that "I thought I was a millionaire and it turned out I had, like, twenty bucks." Waits credited Brennan with introducing him to much new music, most notably the work of Captain Beefheart, a key influence on the direction in which he wanted to take his music. He later noted that "once you've heard Beefheart it's hard to wash him out of your clothes. It stains, like coffee or blood." He also came under the influence of Harry Partch, a composer who created his own instruments out of everyday materials. Waits began to use images rather than moods or characters as the basis for his songs.

Waits wrote the songs which would be included on the album Swordfishtrombones during a two-week trip to Ireland. He recorded it at Sunset Sound studios and produced the album himself; Brennan often attended the sessions and gave him advice. Swordfishtrombones abandoned the jazz sound characteristic of his earlier work; it was his first album not to feature a saxophone. When the album was finished, he took it to Asylum, but they declined to release it. Waits wanted to leave the label; in his view, "They liked dropping my name in terms of me being a 'prestige' artist, but when it came down to it they didn't invest a whole lot in me in terms of faith".

Chris Blackwell of Island Records learned of Waits's dissatisfaction and approached him, offering to release Swordfishtrombones; Island had a reputation for signing more experimental acts, such as King Crimson, Roxy Music, and Sparks. Waits did not tour to promote the album, partly because Brennan was pregnant. Although not enthusiastic regarding the new trend for music videos, he appeared in one for the song "In the Neighborhood", co-directed by Haskell Wexler and Michael A. Russ. Russ also designed the Swordfishtrombones album cover, featuring an image of Waits with Lee Kolima, a circus strongman, and Angelo Rossitto, a dwarf. According to David Smay, Swordfishtrombones was "the record where Tom Waits radically reinvented himself and reshaped the musical landscape." The album was critically well received; the New Musical Express named it album of the year.

In 1983, Waits appeared in three more Coppola films: in Rumble Fish he played Benny, a philosopher running a billboard store, in The Outsiders he was Buck Merrill, a one-line role, and in The Cotton Club he again made a cameo appearance, this time as the eponymous club's maître'd. He later stated that "Coppola is actually the only film director in Hollywood that has a conscience ... most of them are egomaniacs and money-grabbing bastards". In September, Brennan gave birth to their daughter, Kellesimone. Waits was determined to keep his family life separate from his public image and to spend as much time as possible with his daughter. With Brennan and their child, Waits moved to New York City to be closer to Brennan's parents and Island's U.S. office. They settled into a loft apartment near Union Square. 

Waits found New York City life frustrating, although it allowed him to meet many new musicians and artists. He befriended John Lurie of The Lounge Lizards, and the duo began sharing a music studio in the Westbeth artist-community building in Greenwich Village. He began networking in the city's arts scene, and, at a party Jean-Michel Basquiat held for Lurie, he met the filmmaker Jim Jarmusch.

Rain Dogs and Franks Wild Years: 1985–1988

Waits recorded his eighth studio album, Rain Dogs, at the RCA Studios in mid 1985. Waits called the album "kind of an interaction between Appalachia and Nigeria". Keith Richards played on several tracks; Richards later acknowledged Waits's encouragement of his first solo album, Talk is Cheap. Filmmaker Jean-Baptiste Mondino directed a music video of the Rain Dogs track "Downtown Train". The song was subsequently covered by Patty Smyth in 1987, and later by Rod Stewart, where it reached the top five in 1990. In 1985, Rolling Stone magazine named Waits its "Songwriter of the Year", and in 2003 it would rank Rain Dogs among the 500 Greatest Albums of All Time. In September 1985, his son Casey was born. Waits assembled a band and went on tour, kicking it off in Scotland in October before proceeding around Europe and then the US. He changed the setlist for each performance; most of the songs chosen were from his two Island albums.

Returning to the U.S., he travelled to New Orleans to appear in Jarmusch's film, Down by Law. Jarmusch wrote Down by Law with Waits and Lurie in mind; they played two of the three main roles, with Roberto Benigni as the third. The film opened and closed with Waits songs taken from Rain Dogs. Jarmusch noted that "Tom and I have a kindred aesthetic. An interest in unambitious people, marginal people." The pair developed a friendship; Waits called Jarmusch "Dr Sullen", while Jarmusch called Waits "The Prince of Melancholy".

Waits had devised the idea of a musical play, Franks Wild Years, which would be loosely based on the eponymous song from Swordfishtrombones. In late 1985, he reached an agreement that the play would be performed by the Steppenwolf Theatre Company in Chicago's Briar Street Theatre for a three-month stretch from June 1986. During the show, Waits starred as the central character, Frank. Reviews were generally positive. He had initially considered a run in New York City, but decided against it. The songs from the show were recorded at Universal Recording Studios for his ninth studio album, Franks Wild Years, and released by Island a year later, in 1987. After its release, Waits toured North America and Europe, his last full tour for two decades. Two of these performances were recorded and used as the basis for a concert film directed by Chris Blum, Big Time.

Waits had also continued interacting and working with other artists he admired. He was a great fan of The Pogues and went on a Chicago pub crawl with them in 1986. The following year, he appeared as a master of ceremonies on several dates of Elvis Costello's "Wheel of Fortune" tour. 

In September 1987, he joined singers like Springsteen, Costello, and k. d. lang by appearing in a "Black and White Night" at Los Angeles' Ambassador Hotel to celebrate the life of singer-songwriter Roy Orbison, of whom Waits was a fan. 1988 saw Waits contribute a cover of the song "Heigh Ho" in Hal Willner's Disney-themed album, Stay Awake.

In Fall 1986, he took a small part in Candy Mountain, a film by Robert Frank and Rudy Wurlitzer, as millionaire golf enthusiast Al Silk. He then starred in Hector Babenco's Ironweed, as Rudy the Kraut, a more substantial role. Hoskyns noted that Babenco's film put Waits "on the mainstream Hollywood map as a character actor". In Fall 1987, Waits and his family left New York and returned to Los Angeles, settling on Union Avenue. In summer 1988, he appeared as a hitman in Robert Dornhelm's film Cold Feet, filmed in Gallatin National Forest, and that year he provided his voice for Jarmusch's film Mystery Train.

Although Waits had provided a voice-over for a 1981 television advert for Butcher's Blend dog food, he hated when musicians allowed companies to use their songs in advertising; he said that "artists who take money for ads poison and pervert their songs". In November 1988, he brought a lawsuit against Frito-Lay for using an actor imitating his voice to advertise Doritos; it came to court in April 1990, and Waits won the case in 1992. He received a $2.6 million settlement, a sum larger than his earnings from all of his previous albums combined. This earned him and Brennan reputations as tireless adversaries.

The Black Rider, Bone Machine, and Alice: 1989–1998

In 1989, Waits began planning a collaboration with Robert Wilson, a theatre director he had known throughout the 1980s. Their project was a "cowboy opera" titled The Black Rider. It was to be based around a German folk tale, that of the Freischütz. In 2004, Waits related that "Wilson is my teacher. There's nobody that's affected me that much as an artist". Waits was scheduled to write the music for the play, and at the suggestion of Allen Ginsberg, Waits and Wilson approached the Beat poet William S. Burroughs to write the play. To do this, they flew to Kansas to meet with Burroughs, who agreed to join their project. Waits travelled to Hamburg in May 1989 to work on the project, and was later joined there by Burroughs. The Black Rider debuted in Hamburg's Thalia in March 1990. On completing its run at the Thalia, the play went on an international tour, with a second run of performances occurring in the mid-2000s.

In June 1989, Waits travelled to London to appear in Ann Guedes' film, Bearskin: An Urban Fairytale. He proceeded to Ireland, where he was joined by Brennan and spent time with her family. In December 1989, he began a stint as Curly, a mobster's son, at the Los Angeles Theater Center production of Thomas Babe's play Demon Wine. Over the next four years, he made seven film appearances. He nevertheless repeatedly told press that he did not see himself as an actor, but only as someone who did some acting. He made a brief appearance as a plainclothes cop in The Two Jakes (1990) and then a disabled war veteran in Terry Gilliam's The Fisher King (1991). He had a cameo in Steve Rash' Queens Logic (1991) and then played a pilot-for-hire in Héctor Babenco's At Play in the Fields of the Lord (1991). He appeared as Renfield in Coppola's 1992 film Bram Stoker's Dracula. Waits starred as Earl Piggot, an alcoholic limousine driver, in Robert Altman's Short Cuts. Hoskyns stated that this "may be the best performance Waits ever gave as an actor."

In 1991, Waits and his family moved to the outskirts of Sonoma. Waits' family later relocated to a secluded house near Valley Ford after a bypass road was built near to their first Sonama County house. Also in 1991, 13 of Waits' 1971 pre-Asylum Records recordings were released for the first time on the first volume of  Tom Waits: The Early Years. Waits was angered at this, describing many of his early demos as "baby pictures" that he would not want released. A second volume with 13 more recordings from 1971 was released in 1993.  In April 1992, Waits released the soundtrack album to Jarmusch's Night on Earth. Largely instrumental, it had been recorded at the Prairie Sun studio in Cotati. In 1992, Waits gave up drinking alcohol and joined Alcoholics Anonymous. In the early 1990s he took part in several charitable causes. In 1990 he contributed a song to the HIV/AIDS benefit album Red Hot + Blue and later appeared at a Wiltern Theater fundraising show for the victims of the 1992 Los Angeles riots.

In August 1992, Waits released his tenth studio album, Bone Machine. The album was recorded in an old storage room at Prairie Sun. Waits described wanting to explore "more machinery sounds" with the album. Eight of the album tracks were co-written by Brennan, reflecting her growing impact over his work. The album cover was co-designed by Waits and Jesse Dylan. Jarmusch filmed a video for the album song "I Don't Wanna Grow Up". Critic Steve Huey called it "perhaps Tom Waits's most cohesive album ... a morbid, sinister nightmare, one that applied the quirks of his experimental '80s classics to stunningly evocative—and often harrowing—effect ... Waits's most affecting and powerful recording, even if it isn't his most accessible." The album won a Grammy Award for Best Alternative Album; in response to the news, Waits told Jarmusch: "alternative to what?!"

Waits next appeared in Jarmusch's film Coffee and Cigarettes, where he was filmed having a conversation with the rock singer Iggy Pop. Waits decided that he wanted to record an album of the songs written for The Black Rider play, doing so at Los Angeles' Sunset Sound Factory. The album, The Black Rider, was released in the fall of 1993. Waits and Wilson decided to collaborate again, this time on an operatic treatment about the novelist Lewis Carroll's relationship with Alice Liddell, who had provided the inspiration for Alice in Wonderland and Through the Looking Glass. Again scheduled to premier at the Thalia, they began working on the project in Hamburg in early 1992. Waits characterized the songs he wrote for the play as "adult songs for children, or children's songs for adults". In his lyrics, Waits drew on his increasing interest in freak shows and the physically deformed. He thought the play itself was about "repression, mental illness and obsessive, compulsive disorders". Alice premiered at the Thalia in December 1992.

In early 1993, Brennan was pregnant with Waits's third child, Sullivan. He decided to reduce his workload so as to spend more time with his children; this isolation spawned rumours that he was seriously ill or had separated from his wife. For three years, he turned down all offers to perform gigs or appear in movies. However, he made several cameos and guest appearances on albums by musicians he admired. The English musician Gavin Bryars visited him in California and Waits added vocals for a re-release of Bryars's Jesus' Blood Never Failed Me Yet, which was then nominated for the 1993 Mercury Music Award. 

In February 1996, he held a benefit performance to raise funds for the legal defense of his friend Don Hyde, who had been charged with distributing LSD. He also contributed two songs to the soundtrack album of the film Dead Man Walking, released that year, while he then contributed another song to the 1997 film The End of Violence. In 1998, Island released Beautiful Maladies, a compilation of 23 Waits tracks from his five albums with the company; he had been allowed to select the tracks himself. That year, Waits also produced and funded Weiss's album, Extremely Cool, as a favor to his old friend.

Mule Variations and Woyzeck: 1999–2003

After his contract with Island expired, Waits decided not to try to renew it, particularly as Blackwell had resigned from the company. He signed to a smaller record label, Anti-, recently launched as an offshoot of the punk-label Epitaph Records. He described the company as "a friendly place". The president of Anti-, Andy Kaulkin, said the label was "blown away that Tom would even consider us. We are huge fans." Waits himself praised the label: "Epitaph is a label run by and for artists and musicians, where it feels much more like a partnership than a plantation ... We shook on the deal over a coffee in a truck stop. I know it's going to be an adventure."

In March 1999, Anti- released his album Mule Variations. Waits had been recording the tracks at Prairie Sun since June 1998. The tracks often dealt with themes involving rural life in the United States and were influenced by the early blues recordings made by Alan Lomax; Waits coined the term "surrural" ("surreal" and "rural") to describe the album's contents. On its release, Mule Variations reached number 30 on the U.S. Billboard 200, representing the highest showing of a Waits album. The album was critically well received, being named "Album of the Year" by Mojo magazine, and was given a Grammy Award for Best Contemporary Folk Album. On the Grammy categorization of the album as folk music, Waits noted: "That's not a bad thing to be called if you've got to be in some kind of category."

Also in March 1999, Waits gave his first live show in three years at Paramount Theater, Austin, Texas as part of the South by Southwest festival. He subsequently appeared in an episode of VH1's Storytellers television show, where he performed several tracks. In the later part of the year he embarked on the Mule Variations tour, primarily in the U.S. but also featuring dates in Berlin. In October, he performed at Neil Young's annual Bridge School benefit gig. That year, he also appeared in the Kinka Usher film Mystery Men, a comic book spoof, where he played Dr A. Heller, an eccentric inventor living in an abandoned amusement park. In 2000, Waits produced Wicked Grin, the 2001 album of his friend John Hammond; the album contained several covers of Waits songs.

Also in 2000, Waits began writing songs for Wilson's production of the Georg Büchner play, Woyzeck, scheduled to start at the Betty Nansen Theater in Copenhagen in November 2000. He initially worked on the songs at home before traveling to Copenhagen for rehearsals in October. Waits stated that he liked the play because it was "a proletariat story  ... about a poor soldier who is manipulated by the government". He decided to then record the songs he had written for both Alice and Woyzeck, placing them on separate albums. For these recordings, he brought in a range of jazz and avant-garde musicians from San Francisco. The two albums, titled Alice and Blood Money, were released simultaneously in May 2002. Alice entered the U.S. album chart at number 32 and Blood Money at number 33, his highest charting positions at that time. Waits described Alice as being "more metaphysical or something, maybe more water, more feminine", while Blood Money was "more earthbound, more carnival, more the slaving meat-wheel that we're all on". Of the two, Alice was better received by critics.

In May 2001, Waits accepted a Founders Award at the 18th annual American Society of Composers, Authors and Publishers (ASCAP) Pop Music Awards in a ceremony at Los Angeles' Beverly Hilton Hotel. That same month, he joined singers Nancy and Ann Wilson (of Heart), as well as Randy Newman, in launching a $40 million lawsuit against mp3.com for copyright infringement. In September 2002, he appeared at a hearing on accounting practices within the music industry in California. There, he expressed satisfaction with Anti- but declared more broadly that "the record companies are like cartels. It's a nightmare to be trapped in one."

In September 2003, Waits performed at the Healing the Divide fundraiser in New York City, and contributed a track to that year's release of the album, Tribute to the Ramones. This latter track earned him a Grammy Award nomination for "Best Vocal Rock Performance".

Real Gone: 2004–2011

In 2004, Waits's fifteenth studio album, Real Gone, was released. Waits had recorded it in an abandoned schoolhouse in Locke. Hoskyns called the album Waits's "roughest, most unkempt music to date". It incorporated Waits beatboxing, a technique he had picked up from his growing interest in hip hop. Humphries characterized it as "the most overtly political album of Waits's career". It featured three highly political songs expressing Waits's anger at the presidency of George W. Bush and the Iraq War. He stated that "I'm not a politician. I keep my mouth shut because I don't want to put my foot in it. But at a certain point, saying absolutely nothing is a political statement of its own." Real Gone received largely good reviews. It made the Billboard Top 30 as well as the Top 10 in several European album charts, also earning him a nomination for Best International Male Solo Artist at the 2005 Brit Awards. In October 2004, he launched a tour in Vancouver before heading to Europe, where his shows were sell-outs: his only London gig saw 78,000 applications for around 3,700 available tickets.

After several years of making no film appearances, he played a gun-toting Seventh-day Adventist in Tony Scott's 2005 film, Domino. That year, he appeared in Benigni's film The Tiger and the Snow, for which Waits had travelled to Italy. He followed this with a performance as an angel posing as a tramp in the 2007 film Wristcutters: A Love Story. In the summer of 2006, Waits embarked of a short tour of southern and Midwest states, titled Orphans. His son, Casey, played with him in the band accompanying him on the tour. In November 2006, he issued Orphans: Brawlers, Bawlers & Bastards, a 54-song three-disc box set of rarities, unreleased tracks, and new compositions. Waits described its contents as "songs that fell behind the stove while making dinner". Orphans made the top ten in several European charts. That year, he also made another guest appearance on the Sparklehorse album Dreamt for Light Years in the Belly of a Mountain.

In January 2008, Waits performed at a benefit for Bet Tzedek Legal Services—The House of Justice, a nonprofit poverty law center, in Los Angeles. 

In 2008, he embarked on his Glitter and Doom Tour, starting in the U.S. and then moving to Europe. Both of his sons played with him on the tour. At the June concert in El Paso, Texas, he was awarded the key to the city.

Waits continued acting, appearing as Mr Nick in Terry Gilliam's 2009 film, The Imaginarium of Doctor Parnassus.

Waits found himself in a situation similar to his earlier one with Frito Lay in 2000 when Audi approached him, asking to use "Innocent When You Dream" (from Franks Wild Years) for a commercial broadcast in Spain. Waits declined, but the commercial ultimately featured music very similar to that song. Waits undertook legal action, and a Spanish court recognized that there had been a violation of Waits's moral rights in addition to the infringement of copyright. The production company, Tandem Campany Guasch, was ordered to pay compensation to Waits through his Spanish publisher. Waits later joked that they got the name of the song wrong, thinking it was called "Innocent When You Scheme". In 2005, Waits sued Adam Opel AG, claiming that, after having failed to sign him to sing in their Scandinavian commercials, they had hired a sound-alike singer. In 2007, the suit was settled, and Waits gave his proceeds to charity.

Bad as Me and later work: 2011–present
In 2010, Waits was reported to be working on a new stage musical with director and long-time collaborator Robert Wilson and playwright Martin McDonagh.

In early 2011, Waits completed a set of 23 poems titled Seeds on Hard Ground, which were inspired by Michael O'Brien's portraits of the homeless in his book, Hard Ground, which included the poems alongside the portraits. In anticipation of the book release, Waits and ANTI- printed limited edition chapbooks of the poems to raise money for Redwood Empire Food Bank, a homeless referral and family support service in Sonoma County, California. As of January 26, 2011, four editions, each limited to 1,000 copies, sold out, raising $90,000 for the food bank.

In March 2011, Waits was inducted into the Rock and Roll Hall of Fame by Neil Young. In accepting the award, he stated: "They say I have no hits and that I'm difficult to work with ... like it's a bad thing."

On February 24, 2011, it was announced via Waits's official website that he had begun work on his next studio album. Waits said through his website that on August 23 he would "set the record straight" in regards to rumors of a new release. On August 23, the title of the new album was revealed to be Bad as Me, and the lead single and title track started being offered via Amazon.com and other sites. The album was released on October 24.

In 2012, Waits had a supporting role in the crime comedy film, Seven Psychopaths, written and directed by Martin McDonagh, in which he played a retired serial killer.

In 2013, Waits's cover of "Shenandoah", recorded with Keith Richards, was included on the compilation album Son of Rogue's Gallery: Pirate Ballads, Sea Songs & Chanteys. The album was released February 19 on ANTI-. On May 5, 2013, he joined the Rolling Stones on stage at the Oracle Arena in Oakland, California, to duet with Mick Jagger on the song "Little Red Rooster". The same year, the songs "Hold On" and "I Don't Wanna Grow Up" were sung by the character Beth Greene (Emily Kinney) in The Walking Dead episodes "I Ain't a Judas" and "Infected", respectively. On October 27, 2013, Waits performed at the 27th annual Bridge School Benefit concert in Mountain View California. Rolling Stone called it a "triumph".

Over the years, Waits made six regular appearances on the Late Show with David Letterman, and on May 14, 2015, he sang "Take One Last Look" on the show's fifth to last broadcast. He was accompanied by Larry Taylor on upright bass and Gabriel Donohue on piano accordion, with the horn section of the CBS Orchestra. In the fall of 2015, Waits's work was featured in several songs adapted for stage performance in Chicago Shakespeare theater's production of The Tempest.

In 2016, Waits embarked upon litigation against French artist Bartabas, who had used several of Waits's songs as a backdrop to a theatrical performance. Claims and counterclaims were made, with Bartabas claiming to have sought and been granted permission to use the material (and to have paid $400,000 for the privilege) but with Waits claiming that his identity had been stolen. The court ruled in Bartabas's favor, and the circus performance was allowed to continue, although the threat of further litigation meant that it was not performed outside France and the resulting DVD release does not contain Waits's material.

In 2018, Waits had a feature role in The Ballad of Buster Scruggs, a western anthology film by the Coen Brothers, which was released on Netflix. His character, the Prospector in the "All Gold Canyon" story, digs for gold in a valley in the Old West. Also in 2018, Waits provided the recorded narration for performances of Martin McDonagh's play A Very Very Very Dark Matter, which was performed at the Bridge Theatre, London. In 2021, Waits had a supporting role in Licorice Pizza, a coming-of-age film by Paul Thomas Anderson.

Musical style

Hoskyns described the "core sound" of Waits's early work as being that of a "Beat verse/jazz-trio". During his Blue Valentine tour, Waits began experimenting more with sounds derived from the blues, with Humphries arguing that Waits had "always been indebted" to the blues. In later life, he preferred to be thought of as a blues singer, although accepted the label of a folk singer.

Waits has made use of blues, jazz, vaudeville and experimental.

Waits described his voice as being "the sand in the sandwich". He has modelled some of his early vocal mannerisms after Richard Buckley. Waits was usually reticent to discuss the specifics of his song-writing with journalists. His work was influenced by his voracious reading and by conversations that he overheard in diners. A major influence was the Beat writer Jack Kerouac, although other writers who inspired him included Charles Bukowski, Nelson Algren, John Rechy, and Hubert Selby Jr. He was also inspired by the comedian Lenny Bruce. Musically, he was influenced by Randy Newman, and Dr. John. He regarded James Brown as one of his musical heroes, and was also a great fan of the Rolling Stones. He has praised Dylan, noting that "for a songwriter, Dylan is as essential as a hammer and nails and saw are to a carpenter", as well as the country musician Merle Haggard, relating: "Want to learn how to write songs? Listen to Merle Haggard."

As of 1982, Waits's musical style shifted; Hoskyns noted that this new style "was fashioned out of diverse and disparate ingredients". This new style was influenced by Captain Beefheart and Harry Partch. Noting that he had a "gravelly timbre" to his voice, Humphries characterized Waits's voice as one that "sounds like it was hauled through Hades in a dredger". His voice was described by critic Daniel Durchholz as sounding as though "it was soaked in a vat of bourbon, left hanging in the smokehouse for a few months, and then taken outside and run over with a car". Rolling Stone also noted his "rusted plow-blade voice". One of Waits's own favorite descriptions of his vocal style was that of "Louis Armstrong and Ethel Merman meeting in Hell". Humphries cited him, alongside Kris Kristofferson, John Prine, and Randy Newman, as a number of U.S. singers who followed Dylan in breaking away from conventional styles of popular music and singing with their "distinctive" voices.

Humphries described "Waitsworld" as a place of "the ricocheted romantics bent out of shape by a broad who should have known better; the twisted psychotics; the loners; the losers". By Blue Valentine, violent death had become a recurrent lyrical theme in his work; he wrote the song "Sweet Little Bullet" from that album, for instance, about a 15-year-old girl who committed suicide by jumping from a high window along the Hollywood Bowl. In his later work, orphanhood also became a recurring theme. Many of his songs make reference to fictional locations that he has invented, such as the eponymous term in his song "Burma Shave". Hoskyns also noted that many Waits songs, such as "Burma Shave" and "Georgia Lee", reflect an "abiding concern for runaways and kids in danger". Andy Gill expressed the view that throughout Waits's oeuvre, "the theme of lowlife redemption, of escape, is ever-present".

Waits tended to wear all-black. Humphries noted that "on stage, Waits is a consummate performer, a raconteur of the recherché, and a genuine wit." Waits has stated that a performance should be "a spectacle and entertaining". It was on his 1977 tour for Foreign Affairs that he started employing props as part of his routine; one recurring prop was a megaphone through which he would shout at the audience.

Personal life

During the 1970s, Waits had a brief relationship with comedian Elayne Boosler, an intermittent relationship with Bette Midler, and a relationship with Rickie Lee Jones.

In 1980, Waits married frequent collaborator Kathleen Brennan. They live in Sonoma County, California, and have three children: Kellesimone Wylder Waits (born 1983), Casey Waits (born 1985) and Sullivan Blake Waits (born 1993). After he married and had children, Waits became increasingly reclusive. Safeguarding the privacy of his family life became very important to him.

During interviews, he has deflected questions about his personal life, and refused to sanction any biography. When Barney Hoskyns was researching his unauthorized 2009 biography, Lowside of the Road: A Life of Tom Waits, Waits and his wife asked people not to talk to him. Hoskyns believed that it was Brennan who was responsible for the "wall of inaccessibility" surrounding Waits.

Stage persona
Waits has been determined to keep a distance between his public persona and his personal life. According to Hoskyns, Waits hides behind his persona, noting that "Tom Waits is as much of a character created for his fans as it is a real man". In Hoskyns's view, Waits's self-image is in part "a self-protective device, a screen to deflect attention". A few music journalists have gone so far as to suggest that Waits is a "poseur". Hoskyns regarded Waits's "persona of the skid-row boho/hobo, a young man out of time and place" as an "ongoing experiment in performance art". He added that Waits has adopted a "self-appointed role as the bard of the streets". Mick Brown, a music journalist from Sounds who interviewed Waits in the mid-1970s, noted that "he had immersed himself in this character to the point where it wasn't an act and had become an identity". Louie Lista, a friend of Waits's during the 1970s, stated that the singer's general attitude was that of "I'm an outsider, but I'll revel in being an outsider". In a similar manner to contemporaries like Bob Dylan and Neil Young, Waits is known for cutting contact with figures he worked with in his past.

Another friend from that period, Troubadour-manager Robert Marchese, related that Waits cultivated "the whole mystique of this really funky dude and all that Charles Bukowski crap" to give "his impression of how funky poor folk really are", whereas in reality Waits was "basically a middle-class, San Diego mom-and-pop-schoolteacher kid". Humphries thought that there was a "conservative element" to Waits's persona, stating that behind his public image, "Waits has always been more of a white-picket-fence kind of guy than you might imagine."

Jarmusch described Waits as "a very contradictory character", stating that he is "potentially violent if he thinks someone is screwing with him, but he's gentle and kind too". Herbert Hardesty, who worked with Waits on Blue Valentine, called him "a very pleasant human being, a very nice person". Humphries referred to him as "an essentially reticent man ... reflective and surprisingly shy". He has a sense of humor and enjoys jokes. Hoskyns described Waits as "unequivocally—some would say almost gruffly—heterosexual".

Hoskyns suggested that Waits has had an "on-off affair with alcohol, never quite able to shake it off". During the 1970s, he was known as a heavy drinker and a smoker but avoided any drugs harder than cocaine. He told one interviewer, "I discovered alcohol at an early age, and that guided me a lot." Humphries suggested that Waits's use of alcohol as opposed to illicit drugs marked him out as being different from many of his contemporaries on the 1970s U.S. music scene.

During interviews, Waits has avoided questions about his personal life, gone off on tangents, and thrown in trivia. Humphries noted that Waits has often supplied interviewers with "droll one-liners", something he termed "Waitsisms", observing that the singer was "dripping with wit and vinegar". Waits is known for getting irate with journalists. 
He dislikes touring, but Hoskyns added that Waits has "a strong work ethic".

When asked about his religious beliefs, he noted: "With the God stuff I don't know. I don't know what's out there any more than anyone else."

Reception and legacy

During his career, Waits has had little chart success and no major commercial success. Instead, he has attracted a cult fan following. Hoskyns referred to him as being "as important an American artist as anyone the twentieth century has produced", while Humphries described him as "one of America's finest post-Dylan singer-songwriters". Humphries noted that at the time of his emergence to public fame, Waits represented "a unique voice on the late Seventies pop radar". He thought that Waits was, along with the painter Edward Hopper, "one of the two great depicters of American isolation". Hoskyns noted that by the end of the twentieth century, "Waits was an iconic alternative figure, not just to the fans who'd grown up with him but to subsequent generations of music geeks", coming to be "universally acknowledged as an elder statesman of 'alternative' rock".

Journalist Karen Schoemer of Newsweek stated that "to the postboomer generation, he's more Dylan than Dylan. [His] melting-pot approach to Americana, his brilliant narratives and his hardiness against commercial trends have made him the ultimate icon for the alternative-minded." He was included among the 2010 list of Rolling Stones 100 Greatest Singers, as well as the 2015 Rolling Stone's 100 Greatest Songwriters of All Time.

A number of events have been held for fans of Waits's work, such as "Waiting for Waits" in Mallorca and the "Straydogs Party" in Denmark. Various cabaret shows have been held devoted to Waits's songs, including Robert Berdahl's Warm Beer, Cold Women and Stewart D'Arrietta's Belly of a Drunken Piano. When the actor Robert Carlyle formed a theatre, he named it the Rain Dog Theatre after Waits's album. Among the celebrities who have described themselves as Waits fans are Johnny Depp, John Oliver, Jordan Peterson, Jerry Hall, Megan Mullally, and Nick Offerman. In Britain, prominent figures who have described themselves as Waits fans include the historian Simon Schama, the writer Raymond Briggs, the presenter Graham Norton, and the actor Colin Firth. Musicians who noted their admiration for Waits's work included Elvis Costello, Bruce Springsteen, Nanci Griffith, Joe Strummer from the punk rock band The Clash, Michael Stipe of R.E.M., Frank Black of Pixies, and James Hetfield from the heavy metal band Metallica. Bob Dylan, who was a major influence on the young Waits, stated that Waits was one of his "secret heroes".

Many different musicians have covered his songs. In 1995, Holly Cole released an album of Waits's covers, Temptation, while in 2008 Scarlett Johansson did the same with her debut album, Anywhere I Lay My Head. Bruce Springsteen had a commercial success with his cover of Waits's "Jersey Girl", as did Rod Stewart with his covers of Waits tracks "Downtown Train" and "Tom Traubert's Blues". Johnny Cash covered "Down There by the Train" on his 1994 album, American Recordings, calling Waits "a very special writer, my kind of writer". Willie Nelson included a cover of a Waits track on his album, It Always Will Be. The Ramones covered "I Don't Wanna Grow Up" on their final album, Adios Amigos, while Bob Seger covered "Blind Love", "New Coat of Paint", and "Downtown Train", and Norah Jones included a song Waits wrote for her, "Long Way Home", on her album Feels Like Home. Singer-songwriter Tori Amos included a cover of Waits's song "Time" on her 2001 cover album Strange Little Girls; she performed the song on the David Letterman Show, the first musical performance on the show after 9/11.
His tracks have also been selected for use in film. The director Julian Schnabel for instance chose two Waits tracks for inclusion in his award-winning 2008 film The Diving Bell and the Butterfly. The 1995 film, Smoke, used "Innocent When You Dream" as the soundtrack to the closing sequence, "Auggie Wren's Christmas Story", which appeared at the end of the film during and after the closing credits.

Further Waits tribute albums include:
 1989 Fjorton sånger – Tom Waits på svenska, Bad Liver och hans brustna hjärtan
 1990 The piano has been drinking, Gerd Köster, in German–Cologne dialect (GMO)
 1995 Step Right Up: The Songs of Tom Waits, various artists (Manifesto)
 1996 Rød pust: Sven Henriksen synger Tom Waits, Sven Henriksen (Universal Music, Norway/Hele Blikk)
 1998 Povabilo Na Bluz (Invitation to the Blues), Jani Kovacic (Slovenian)
 2000 Nach mir die Sintflut – Ambros singt Waits, Wolfgang Ambros (Sony)
 2000 New Coat of Paint, various artists (Manifesto)
 2001 Wicked Grin, John Hammond (produced by Tom Waits, who appears on several tracks) (Pointblank)
 2001 Saving All My Love – A Tribute to Tom Waits, Claudia Bettinaglio (Herman's)
 2001 Days of Roses, Delmore
 2003 Greetings from HELL – The Tom Waits Songbook, Hell Blues Choir (Tyden & Co.)
 2003 Pornoshow – Laura Fedele Interpreta Tom Waits, Laura Fedele (Auditorium)
 2003 Piosenki Toma Waitsa (Tom Waits's Songs), Kazik Staszewski (Luna Music)
 2005 Being Tom Waits, Billy's Band (Billy's Band)
 2005 The Silver Hearts Play Rain Dogs, The Silver Hearts (Banbury Park)
 2007 À Espera de Tom, Carlos Careqa (Barbearia Espiritual Discos)
 2008 Grapefruit Moon, Southside Johnny with LaBamba's Big Band (Evangeline)
 2017 In Tribute To Tom Waits 7" EP (Antipop)
 2019 Come On Up to the House: Women Sing Waits, 12 Tom Waits songs by various artists (Dualtone Records)
 2021: The Closing Time 2020, Pine Valley Cosmonauts, song-for-song cover of Waits's album Closing Time (Virtue Cider)

Discography

 Closing Time (1973)
 The Heart of Saturday Night (1974)
 Nighthawks at the Diner (1975)
 Small Change (1976)
 Foreign Affairs (1977)
 Blue Valentine (1978)
 Heartattack and Vine (1980)
 Swordfishtrombones (1983)
 Rain Dogs (1985)
 Franks Wild Years (1987)
 Bone Machine (1992)
 The Black Rider (1993)
 Mule Variations (1999)
 Alice (2002)
 Blood Money (2002)
 Real Gone (2004)
 Bad as Me (2011)

Tours

 1973: Closing Time touring
 1974–1975: The Heart of Saturday Night touring
 1975–1976: Small Change touring
 1977: Foreign Affairs touring
 1978–1979: Blue Valentine touring
 1980–1982: Heartattack and Vine touring
 1985: Rain Dogs touring
 1987: Big Time touring
 1999: Get Behind the Mule Tour
 2004: Real Gone Tour
 2006: The Orphans Tour
 2008: Glitter and Doom Tour

Filmography

References

Sources

Further reading

External links

 
 
 
 
 
 
 Tom Waits Library

 
1949 births
Living people
20th-century American composers
20th-century American male actors
20th-century American singers
21st-century American composers
21st-century American male actors
21st-century American singers
American male composers
American male film actors
American male singer-songwriters
American multi-instrumentalists
American people of Norwegian descent
American people of Scotch-Irish descent
American bass-baritones
American rock singers
American rock songwriters
Anti- (record label) artists
Asylum Records artists
Epitaph Records artists
Grammy Award winners
Helpmann Award winners
Island Records artists
Male actors from San Diego
Male actors from the San Francisco Bay Area
Musicians from the San Francisco Bay Area
People from Chula Vista, California
People from Echo Park, Los Angeles
People from Pomona, California
People from Sebastopol, California
Singer-songwriters from California
Volpi Cup winners
Writers from California